Rebecca Seiferle is an American poet.

Life
Seiferle has a BA from the State University of New York with a major in English and History, and a minor in Art History. In 1989, she received her MFA from Warren Wilson College.

She taught English and creative writing for a number of years at San Juan College and has taught at the Provincetown Fine Arts Center, Key West Literary Seminar, Port Townsend Writer's Conference, Gemini Ink, the Stonecoast MFA program She has been poet-in-residence at Brandeis University.

She has regularly reviewed for The Harvard Review and Calyx, and her work has appeared in Partisan Review, Boulevard, Prairie Schooner, The Southern Review, Alaska Quarterly Review, Carolina Quarterly. She is editor of The Drunken Boat.

She lives with her family in Tucson, Arizona.

Awards
Her first book, The Ripped-Out Seam won the Bogin Award from the Poetry Society of America, the Writers' Exchange Award from Poets & Writers, and the National Writers Union Prize, and was a finalist for the Paterson Poetry Prize.

Her second collection, The Music We Dance To (Sheep Meadow 1999) won the 1998 Cecil Hemley Memorial Award from the Poetry Society of America. 
Her third poetry collection, Bitters, published by Copper Canyon Press, won the Western States Book Award and a Pushcart Prize. 
Her translation of Vallejo's Trilce was a finalist for the 1992 PenWest Translation Award.

In 2004, she was awarded a literary fellowship from the Lannan Foundation. Rebecca Seiferle, in 2012, was declared the poet laureate of Tucson Arizona.

Works
THE CUSTOM; HOW TO SPEAK IN BABYLON; DOCUMENTARIES; THE RIPPED-OUT SEAM, wisewomensweb
"Law of Inertia", pif Magazine
  

 "Room of Dust", Santa Fe Poetry Broadside, Issue #11, September, 1999 
The Gift, Copper Canyon Press (2001)
"Wild Tongue", Narrative Magazine, 2008.

Poetry

Translations

 Trilce, César Vallejo, Sheep Meadow Press 1992

Anthologies
Best American Poetry 2000, Scribner's, 

Reversible Monuments: Contemporary Mexican Poetry (Copper Canyon Press 2002), translations of Alfonso D'Aquino and Ernesto Lumbreras
Saludos: Poemas de Nuevo Mexico, Pennywhistle Press
New Mexico Poetry Renaissance, edited by Miriam Sagan and Sharon Neiderman, Red Crane Press, 
The Sheep Meadow Anthology.
Pushcart Prize XXVII, Pushcart Press, 2003,

References

External links
"Interview to Rebecca Seiferle", Anny Ballardini, fieralingue
"Interview with Rebecca Seiferle", Cervena Barva Press

Year of birth missing (living people)
Living people
State University of New York alumni
Warren Wilson College alumni
San Juan College faculty
20th-century American poets
American women poets
21st-century American poets
20th-century American women writers
21st-century American women writers
Writers from Tucson, Arizona
Poets from Arizona
American women academics
Municipal Poets Laureate in the United States